The escorteurs of the French Navy were light naval warships used for convoy protection during and after the Second World War.

The earliest escorteurs in the French Navy were purchased from the British Royal Navy and the United States Navy. After the war, these were supplemented by former German and Italian vessels transferred to French control as war reparations.

However, in the 1970s, the designation of escorteur ceased to be used and was replaced with that of frigate, destroyer, aviso or patroller.

Second World War ships 
 Royal Navy:
 River-class frigate (Free French Naval Forces)
 L'Aventure (F707) (ex-HMS Braid) 1944–1961
 L'Escarmouche (F709)  (ex-HMS Frome) 1944–1961
 Tonkinois (F711) (ex-HMS Moyola)  1944–1961
 Croix de Lorraine (F710) (ex-HMS Strule) 1944–1961
 La Surprise (F708) (ex-HMS Torridge) 1944–1964
 La Découverte (F712) (ex-HMS Windrush) 1944–1961
 Flower-class corvettes  (Free French Naval Forces)
 Alysse (ex-HMS Alyssum K100) 1941–1942
 Roselys (ex-HMS Sundew) 1941–1947
 Aconit (ex-HMS Aconite) 1941–1947
 Lobelia (ex-Lobelia) 1941–1947
 Mimosa (ex-Mimosa) 1941–1942
 Commandant Détroyat (Ex-HMS Coriander) 1941–1947
 Commandant d'Estienne d'Orves (ex-HMS Lotus) 1942–1947
 Renoncule (ex-HMS Renonculus) 1941–1947
 Commandant Drogou (ex-HMS Chrysanthemum) 1941–1947
 United States Navy (USN):
 Cannon-class destroyer escort:
 Sénégalais (F702) (ex-USS Corbesier (DE-106)) 1944–1964
 Algérien (F701) (ex-USS Cronin (DE-107)) 1944–1964
 Tunisien (F706) (ex-USS Crosley (DE-108)) 1944–1960
 Marocain (F705) (ex-USS Marocain (DE-109)) 1944–1960
 Hova (F704) (ex-USS Hova (DE-110)) 1944–1964
 Somali (F703) (ex-USS Somali (DE-111)) 1944–1956
  PC-461-class submarine chaser (or coastal patroller):
 Eveillé (ex-USS PC-471) 1944–1959
 Rusé (ex-USS PC-472) 1944–1959
 Ardent (ex-USS PC-473) 1944–1945
 Indiscret (ex-USS PC-474) 1944–1960
 Résolu (ex-USS PC475) 1944–1951
 Emporté (ex-USS PC-480) 1944–1959
 Effronté (ex-USS PC481) 1944–1953
 Enjoué (ex-USS PC-482) 1944–1945
 Tirailleur (ex-USS PC-542) 1944–1958
 Volontaire (ex-USS PC-543) 1944–1964
 Goumier (ex-USS PC-545) 1944–1965
 Franc Tireur (ex-USS PC-545) 1944–1953
 Vigilant (ex-USS PC-550) 1944–1959
 Mameluck (ex-USS PC-551) 1944–1958
 Carabinier (ex-USS PC-556) 1944–1958
 Dragon (ex-USS PC-557) 1944–1959
 Voltigeur (ex-USS PC-559) 1944–1970
 Attentif (ex-USS PC-562) 1944–1953
 Spahi (ex-USS PC-591) 1944–1959
 Fantassin (ex-USS PC-621) 1944–1961
 Grenadier (ex-USS PC-625) 1944–1958
 Lansquenet (ex-USS PC-626) 1944–1958
 Cavalier (ex-USS PC-627) 1944–1951

Post-war ships

War reparations 
 Ex-Regia Marina:
 Capitani Romani-class  light cruiser:
  (ex-Italian cruiser Attilio Regolo)) 1948–1969
  (ex-Italian cruiser Scipione Africano) 1948–1961
 Sloop :
 Francis Garnier (F730) (ex-Italian sloop Eritrea) 1946–1966
 Ex-Kriegsmarine:
 Type 1934A-class destroyer:
 Desaix (ex-German destroyer Z5 Paul Jacobi) 1946–1954
 Kléber (D603) (ex-German destroyer Z6 Theodor Riedel) 1946–1957
 Type 1936A-class and 1936A (Mob)-class destroyer
 Marceau (D601) (ex-German destroyer Z31) 1946–1958
 Hoche (D602) (ex-German destroyer Z25) 1946–1958
 Léopard (ex-German destroyer Z23)
 Type 35 torpedo boat:
 Bir Hacheim (ex-German torpedo boat T11)
 Type 37 torpedo boat:
 Baccarat (ex-German torpedo boat T20)
 Dompaire (ex-German torpedo boat T14)
 Elbing-class torpedo boat:
 L'Alsacien (ex-German torpedo boat T23)
 Le Lorrain (ex-German torpedo boat T28)

Allied fleet ships 
 United States Navy (USN):
 Cannon-class destroyer escort:
 Berbère (F723) (ex-USS Clarence L. Evans (DE-113)) 1952–1969
 Arabe (F707) (ex-USS Samuel S. Miles (DE-183)) 1950–1958
 Kabyle (F718) (ex-USS Riddle (DE-185)) 1950–1959
 Bambara (F719) (ex-USS Swearer (DE-186)) 1950–1959
 Malgache (F724) (ex-USS Baker (DE-190)) 1952–1969
 Sakalave (F720) (ex-USS Wingfield (DE-194)) 1950–1959
 Touareg (F721) (ex-USS Bright (DE-747)) 1950–1958
 Soudanais (F722) (ex-USS Cates (DE-763)) 1950–1959
 Tacoma-class frigate:
 Laplace (F713) (ex-USS Lorain (PF-93)) 1947–1950
 Mermoz (F714) (ex-USS Muskegon (PF-24)) 1947–1950
 Brix (F715) (ex-USS Manitowoc (PF-61)) 1947–1958
 Verrier (F716) (ex-USS Emporia (PF-28)) 1947–1958
  PC-461-class submarine chaser (or coastal patroller):
 Pnom Penh (ex-USS PC-796) 1949–1955
 Hue (ex-USS PC-797) 1950–1955
 Luang Prabang (ex-USS PC-798) 1949–1955
 Kum Kang San (ex-USS PC-799) 1950–
 Flamberge (ex-USS PC-1086) 1951–1956
 Intrépide (ex-USS PC-1130) 1951–1956
 Trident (ex-USS PC-1143) 1951–1956
 Mousquet (ex-USS PC-1143) 1951–1955
 Glaive (ex-USS PC-1146) 1951–1956
 Ardent (ex-USS PC-1167) 1951–1956
 Inconstant (ex-USS PC-1171) 1951–1956
 Légionnaire(ex-USS PC-1226) 1944–1958
 Lancier (ex-USS PC-1227) 1944–1960
 Hussard (ex-USS PC-1235) 1945–1965
 Sabre (ex-USS PC-1248) 1944–1959
 Pique (ex-USS PC-1249) 1944–1959
 Cimeterre (ex-USS PC-1250) 1944–1963
 Coutelas (ex-USS PC-1560) 1944–1963
 Dague (ex-USS PC-1561) 1944–1964
 Javelot (ex-USS PC-1562) 1944–1951

French-built ships

Fleet Escorts – (Escorteurs d'escadre) 

 Classe T 47 (Surcouf class)
 Surcouf (D621) 1955–1972
 Kersaint (D622) 1956–1984
 Cassard (D623) 1956–1974
 Bouvet (D624) 1956–1982
 Dupetit-Thouars (D625) 1957–1988
 Chevalier Paul (D626) 1957–1971
 Maillé-Brézé (D627) 1957–1988
 Vauquelin (D628) 1956–1986
 D’Estrées (D629) 1957–1985
 Du Chayla (D630) 1957–1991
 Casabianca (D631) 1957–1984
 Guépratte (D632) 1957–1985
 Classe T 53
 Duperré (D633) 1957–1972
 La Bourdonnais (D634) 1958–1976
 Forbin (D635) 1958–1981
 Tartu (D636) 1958–1979
 Jauréguiberry (D637) 1958–1977
  – single ship modified for ASW testing
 La Galissonnière (D638) 1962–1990

 Fast Escorts – Escorteurs rapides 

 Type E50 (Le Corse-class) frigate:
 Le Corse (F761) 1955–1975
 Le Brestois (F762) 1956–1975
 Le Boulonnais (F763) 1955–1976
 Le Bordelais (F764) 1955–1976
 Type E52 (Le Normand-class) frigate:
 Le Normand (F765) 1956–1983
 Le Picard (F766) 1956–1979
 Le Gascon (F767) 1957–1977
 Le Lorrain (F768) 1957–1976
 Le Bourguignon (F769) 1957–1976
 Le Champenois (F770) 1957–1975
 Le Savoyard (F771) 1957–1980
 Le Breton (F772) 1957–1976
 Le Basque (F773) 1957–1979
 L'Agenais (F774) 1958–1985
 Le Béarnais (F775) 1958–1979
 Type E52B:
 L'Alsacien (F776) 1960–1981
 Le Provençal (F777) 1959–1981
 Le Vendéen (F778) 1960–1982

Sloop Escorts – Avisos escorteurs

 Commandant Rivière-class frigate
 Victor Schœlcher (F725) 1962–1988
 Commandant Bory (F726) 1964–1996
 Amiral Charner (F727) 1962–1990
 Doudart de Lagrée (F728) 1963–1991
 Balny (F729) 1970–1994
 Commandant Rivière (F733) 1962–1984
 Commandant Bourdais (F740) 1963–1990
 Protet (F748) 1962–1992
  1963–1996

Coastal Escorts – Escorteurs côtiers

 
 Le Fougueux (P641) 1954–1975
 L'Opiniâtre (P642) 1954–1975
 L'Agile (P643) 1954–1976
  :
 L'Adroit (P644) 1957–1979
 L'Alerte (P645) 1957–1979
 L'Attentif (P646) 1957–1978
 L'Intrépide (P630) 1958–1976
 L'Ardent (P635) 1958–1979
 L'Etourdi (P637) 1958–1976
 L'Enjoué (P647)  1958–
 Le Hardi (P648) 1958–1977
 L'Effronté (P638) 1959–
 Le Frondeur (P639) 1959–1977
 Le Fringant (P640) 1959–1982

 See also 
 List of active French Navy ships
 Fusiliers Marins

Notes

 Citations 

References
 Francis Garnier sur site netmarine
 Escorteur d'escadre Surcouf netmarine.net
 Escorteur rapide Le Corse
 Escorteur rapide Le Normand – site netmarine
 Escorteur rapide L'Alsacien – site netmarine
 Aviso-escorteur Commandant Rivière – site netmarine
 Le Fougueux (P641) fougueux.nl
 EC L'Enjoué www.escorteursrapides.net
 Jean Moulin, Rober Dumas, Les Escorteurs d'escadre'', Marines éditions Nantes, 1997 

French Navy